Iranamadu or Iranaimadu is a military city in Kilinochchi District, Sri Lanka. It includes a lake that provides water to the paddy fields in the region. The Sri Lankan Army claimed in early 2009 that they had captured an Air Tiger airstrip in the area.

Transport

Air
The airstrip which once belonged to the LTTE is being expanded by the Sri Lankan Airforce to make it an important airforce base in the north. It will be called SLAF Iranamadu.

See also

Kilinochchi

References

External links 
Satellite image of LTTE airstrip
http://wikimapia.org/11136954/Iranamadu-LTTE-Air-Strip

Villages in Kilinochchi District
Kandavalai DS Division